Neyaashiinigmiing 27 is a reserve within Bruce County, Ontario. It is one of the parcels of land administered by the Chippewas of Nawash Unceded First Nation.  The name Neyaashiinigmiing in the Ojibwe language means "at/by the point-of-land portage" referring to the reserve being located at the Cape Croker portage.

Demographics

References

Ojibwe reserves in Ontario
Communities in Bruce County
Unceded territories in Ontario
Chippewas of Nawash Unceded First Nation